James L. Curry was a second baseman in Major League Baseball. He was born on March 10, 1886, in Camden, New Jersey. He was 5 foot 11 and 160 pounds. In 1909, Curry played one game for the Philadelphia Athletics. In 1911 he played with the New York Highlanders in four games, and in 1918 he played for the Detroit Tigers for five games. In his career, Curry went 8-for-35 for a .229 batting average.

Jim Curry died on August 2, 1938, in Grenloch, New Jersey.

Enternal links
Baseball Reference – major league profile
Baseball Reference – minor league career

Major League Baseball second basemen
Detroit Tigers players
New York Highlanders players
Philadelphia Athletics players
Binghamton Bingoes players
Bridgeport Hustlers players
Charlotte Hornets (baseball) players
Hartford Senators players
Holyoke Papermakers players
Jeannette Jays players
Reading Pretzels players
Rocky Mount Tar Heels players
Shamokin Indians players
Springfield Buckeyes players
Tampa Smokers players
Wellsville Rainmakers players
Wilkes-Barre Barons (baseball) players
Winston-Salem Twins players
Baseball players from Camden, New Jersey
1886 births
1938 deaths